Böyük Kəngərli (also, Bëyuk Kengerli, Beyuk-Kengerli, and Böyük Gängärli) is a village and municipality in the Kurdamir Rayon of Azerbaijan.

References 

Populated places in Kurdamir District